Mazeppa Township is  located in Grant County, State of South Dakota, United States. The population consists of 9 people according to the 2000 census. 47% of the inhabitants of the village of Mazeppa are of German, 11% of Irish, and the rest of Norwegian and English origin. was named in honor of Hetman Ivan Mazepa.

History

The establishment of Mazeppa Township has been attributed to a German immigrant couple, Carl and Ernestina Korth, who set up a homestead in Grant County in 1885 after living for seven years in Canada. They seem to have been locally known as Charles and Ernestine Kors.

Geography
The township has a total area of 134.075 km ². South Dakota highway number 81 is the main road for its residents.

Population
As of 2000 there were 79 residents, employed in agricultural production.

Population density - 0.59 persons per square kilometer. Men - 53.16%, female - 46.84%. The racial makeup of the city - white.
The age structure of population: 0–9 years - 20.25%, 10-19 - 2.53%, 20–29 years - 16.46%, 30–39 years - 16.46%, 40–49 years - 11.39%, 50–59 years - 6.33%, 60–69 years - 12.66%, the years 70-79 - 10.13%.

Education

Sixteen percent of Mazeppa's residents aged 25 and older have a bachelor's degree or have graduated from college.

References

Mazeppa Township is now part of the 40 tower, Dakota Range Windfarm footprint.

External links
 Profile for Mazeppa, South Dakota, SD
  Mazeppa on the state public shooting area website

Townships in Grant County, South Dakota
Populated places established in 1885
Townships in South Dakota